Zhang Mengjin, is a former Chinese provincial politician from Zhejiang Province. He most recently served as vice-chairman of the Zhejiang People's Congress. He was also the executive vice-governor of the Zhejiang Province, and the former party chief of Ningbo.

Biography
Zhan was born in October, 1946 in Yuyao, Zhejiang Province. He studied both in Hangzhou University (later merged with Zhejiang University) and the Party School of the Central Committee of the Communist Party of China. He began his professional career in August 1968.

In April 1971, Zhang joined the Communist Party of China. He was the party chief of Fenghua, then Vice-mayor of Ningbo.

Zhang was the General Director and Secretary of the Water Resources Department of Zhejiang Provincial Government. He was the Executive Vice-governor of Zhejiang Province, also a member of the Zhejiang Provincial Party Standing Committee. He retired from active politics in February 2007, and became a vice-chairman of the Zhejiang People's Congress.

References

External links
 Curriculum Vitae of the Governors - Zhang Mengjin 
 China Vitae - Zhangmengjin 

Zhejiang University alumni
Hangzhou University alumni
Politicians from Ningbo
Regional leaders in the People's Republic of China
1946 births
Living people
People's Republic of China politicians from Zhejiang
Chinese Communist Party politicians from Zhejiang
Political office-holders in Zhejiang